Amell Santa de Jesus (born July 30, 1987, in Sabana de la Mar) is a Dominican beauty pageant contestant.  She competed in Miss Dominican Republic Universe 2005, representing the province of Hato Mayor, and ended as 1st runner-up.  Santana then competed in Miss Dominican Republic 2005 and also placed as 1st runner-up. Receiving most of the judge votes, she was crowned as Miss Tierra República Dominicana 2005. A few months later, she represented the Dominican Republic in the 2005 Miss Earth pageant, placing as 1st runner-up. This the first contestant and the highest replacement of Dominican Republic.

References

Living people
1986 births
Dominican Republic beauty pageant winners
Miss Earth 2005 contestants